"Andy's Chest" is a song written by Lou Reed, inspired by the 1968 attempt on Andy Warhol's life. In June 1968, radical feminist writer Valerie Solanas shot Warhol and Mario Amaya, art critic and curator, at Warhol's studio.

The band The Velvet Underground of which Reed was a member, initially recorded the song in 1969, but the definitive version appears on Lou Reed's 1972 own release: Transformer, co-produced by David Bowie and Mick Ronson.

The original 1969 recording of the song, eventually released on the album VU in 1985, is an upbeat pop track. The widely known arrangement that appears on Transformer is more down tempo and layered, and features the characteristic bass style of Herbie Flowers, and prominent backing vocals by David Bowie.
This song is a tribute to Reed's mentor and lifelong friend Andy Warhol. Warhol had extensively supported Reed's group: the Velvet Underground through financing, promotion, bookings, and designing the band's legendary debut album cover. Eventually resenting Warhol's degree of control, (Warhol had inserted Nico into the band's line-up infuriating Reed and band member John Cale), in 1967 the Velvet Underground broke with Nico, Warhol and the whole NY art scene in which they had become entrenched to pursue a rock tour and planning of their second album: White Light/White Heat. Andy Warhol was shot by radical feminist Valerie Solanas, immediately after the split, and only narrowly survived the ordeal. Reed's song was written in sympathy and in thanks to Warhol. The title indicates to the substantial scar across Warhol's chest (the shot went through both lungs, spleen, stomach, liver, and esophagus) and also refers to Warhol's factory, a fantastic menagerie of bizarre, wonderful and precarious characters that the song's surreal lyrics describe.

Personnel
Lou Reed: lead vocals, rhythm guitar
David Bowie: backing vocals
Mick Ronson: lead guitars
Herbie Flowers: bass
John Halsey: drums

References

1969 songs
Songs written by Lou Reed
Lou Reed songs
Song recordings produced by David Bowie
Cultural depictions of Andy Warhol
Cultural depictions of Valerie Solanas